Bahulu or baulu is a traditional Malay pastry (kue/kuih). It is similar in concept to the madeleine cake, but round in shape and composed of different ingredients. There are three versions available, the most common being bahulu cermai (star-shaped) and the more elusive bahulu gulung (shaped like rolls) and bahulu lapis (layered). Bahulu is believed to be originated in Malay Peninsula during the colonization era and is the corruption of the Malaccan Kristang (Portuguese-Eurasian people) word, bolu which means cake. It is usually served during Eid al-Fitr as well as during the Lunar New Year.

In Indonesia, this pastry is quite popular in Kalimantan, especially in Pontianak, Sambas and Singkawang in West Kalimantan. In other parts of Indonesia, bahulu is also called kue bolu kering, an old-fashioned dry bolu cake, and regarded as one of the numerous variant of kue bolu sponge cake.

See also 

 Kue bolu
 Madeleine

References 

Kue
Snack foods
Malay cuisine
Bruneian cuisine
Bruneian snack foods
Malaysian snack foods